Peter Kenneth Wells (born 1965, in Portsmouth) is an English chess Grandmaster and author.
Wells was British Rapidplay Chess Champion in 2002, 2003 and 2007.

Books

External links 

www.whiterosechess.co.uk

1965 births
Living people
Chess grandmasters
English chess players
English sportswriters
British chess writers
English male non-fiction writers